European route E 801 is a European B class road in Portugal and Spain, connecting the cities Coimbra, Portugal and Verín, Spain.

Route 
 
 E80, E01 Coimbra
 E80 Viseu
 E805 Chaves
 
 Verín

External links 
 UN Economic Commission for Europe: Overall Map of E-road Network (2007)
 International E-road network

International E-road network
Roads in Portugal
Roads in Spain